John James "Ed" Greer (born June 7, 1889) was an American football coach. He served as the head football coach at the Catholic University in Washington, D.C. in 1913, compiling a record of 1–4–1.

Head coaching record

College

References

1889 births
Year of death missing
Catholic University Cardinals football coaches
Catholic University Cardinals football players
High school football coaches in Pennsylvania
Players of American football from Washington, D.C.